The Halpin Covered Bridge, also called the High Covered Bridge, is a wooden covered bridge carrying Halpin Bridge Road across the Muddy Branch of the New Haven River in Middlebury, Vermont.  It was listed on the National Register of Historic Places in 1974.

Description and history
The Halpin Covered Bridge is located in a rural area of northern Middlebury, near or on the border with neighboring New Haven on Halpin Bridge Road, a dead-end road off Halpin Road. The bridge spans a gorge carrying the Muddy Branch of the New Haven River, and now provides access only to the Halpin family farm.

The bridge was originally built to serve a marble quarry operation on the east side of the river, and had dry laid stone abutments.  It is one of only two covered bridges in Middlebury.  It had minor repairs made in the 1960s.  In 1994 the bridge had extensive work done by Jan Lewandoski, in which the bridge was completely removed from its crumbling marble abutments, and new concrete abutments were created for it.

See also
National Register of Historic Places listings in Addison County, Vermont
List of Vermont covered bridges
List of bridges on the National Register of Historic Places in Vermont

References

Buildings and structures in Middlebury, Vermont
Bridges completed in 1850
Covered bridges on the National Register of Historic Places in Vermont
Wooden bridges in Vermont
Bridges in Addison County, Vermont
Tourist attractions in Addison County, Vermont
National Register of Historic Places in Addison County, Vermont
Road bridges on the National Register of Historic Places in Vermont
Lattice truss bridges in the United States
1850 establishments in Vermont